Javier Mercedes González (born 24 September 1979 in Asunción) is a Paraguayan footballer currently playing in Paraguay for Club Nacional.

Career

Club career
González began his career in 2000 with Club Cerro Corá. He has also played for Club Sport Colombia, Sportivo Luqueño, Club Guaraní and his current club Libertad in Paraguay.

In 2007 González played in Ecuador with Barcelona S.C.

International career
González has made 2 appearances for the Paraguay national team in 2001 and in 2006.

External links
 BDFA profile

1979 births
Living people
Paraguayan footballers
Association football midfielders
Paraguay international footballers
Sportivo Luqueño players
Club Guaraní players
Club Libertad footballers
Club Nacional footballers
Barcelona S.C. footballers
Expatriate footballers in Ecuador